Juan Aldama (January 3, 1774 in San Miguel el Grande, Guanajuato – June 26, 1811 in Chihuahua) was a Mexican revolutionary rebel soldier during the Mexican War of Independence in 1810.

Biography 

He was also the brother of Ignacio Aldama.

At the beginning of the War of Independence, Aldama was a captain of the cavalry regiment of the Queen's militia. He attended the conspiratorial meetings for independence in Querétaro, organized by Josefa Ortiz de Domínguez, despite having to travel from San Miguel el Grande (now San Miguel de Allende) in neighboring Guanajuato.

Aldama was in San Miguel when he heard news that the conspiracy had been betrayed by a supporter who informed the Spanish colonial authorities. He traveled to Dolores (now Dolores Hidalgo) to inform Miguel Hidalgo y Costilla and Ignacio Allende. He witnessed the Grito de Dolores ("Cry of Dolores") on the night of September 15, 1810, which started the armed conflict.

Aldama was captured by the Spanish colonial authorities on March 21, 1811 at the Wells of Baján in Coahuila. He was court-martialed for insubordination towards the Spanish Crown and executed for treason, by firing squad on June 26, 1811, together with Allende and other members of the rebel army including Mariano Jiménez and Manuel Santa María. 

Aldama's body was decapitated and his head taken to the Alhóndiga de Granaditas where it was shown to the public inside a cage hung from one corner of the building. In 1824, his remains were moved to an altar in the Metropolitan Cathedral in Mexico City. Finally, in 1925, his remains were moved one last time to the mausoleum in the Independence Column in Mexico City.

Legacy 
Aldama is a national hero of Mexico. In his honor, several towns and villages are named after him. The following category includes:

 The municipality of Juan Aldama, Zacatecas.
 The municipality of Villaldama, Nuevo León.
 The municipality of Aldama, Tamaulipas.
 The municipality of Aldama, Chihuahua.
The municipality of Villa Aldama, Veracruz
 The city of León, Guanajuato, was officially renamed to "León de los Aldama" in honor of brothers Juan and Ignacio Aldama.
 The municipality of Los Aldamas, Nuevo León was also named after him and his brother.
 The village of Juan Aldama, "El Tigre", Sinaloa outside of Culiacán.
 The street Juan Aldama in Mexicali, Baja California in the Colonia Independencia (neighborhood).

See also 
History of Mexico

External links
 Biografía de Juan Aldama (Bio)
Juan Aldama, Zacatecas Website
 Los Aldamas, Nuevo Leon
Aldama, Tamaulipas
 Villaldama, Nuevo Leon

1774 births
1811 deaths
People from San Miguel de Allende
Mexican independence activists